Scythris kantarae is a moth of the family Scythrididae. It was described by Bengt Å. Bengtsson in 1997. It is found in Algeria.

References

kantarae
Moths described in 1997